Ratnapura Portuguese fort  ( Rathnapura Pruthugisi Balakotuwa) was built by the Portuguese in Ratnapura, Sri Lanka.

The Portuguese constructed the fort and a church, between 1618 and 1620, on the ground of Saman Devalaya (an ancient devale or Hindu shrine) following the defeat of the King of Sitawaka, Rajasinha I. The town and the fort was later captured by Kirti Sri Raja Singha (the second Nayaka king of Kandy, who destroyed the church and the fort and constructed a Buddhist temple, Maha Saman Devalaya, on the site. In the temple grounds there is a stone sculpture, which depicts the Portuguese General Simao Pinnao, on horseback brandishing a sword, whilst trampling a Sinhalese soldier.

See also 
 Ratnapura Dutch fort

References 

Forts in Sabaragamuwa Province
Portuguese forts in Sri Lanka
Buildings and structures in Ratnapura District
Archaeological protected monuments in Ratnapura District